Beau Dowler (born 16 December 1987) is a former Australian rules football player who played with the Hawthorn Football Club in the Australian Football League.

He was originally from the Noble Park Football Club and then recruited from the TAC Cup side, Oakleigh Chargers in the U/18 competition.  He played for Vic Metro, in the Teal Cup Championships and was named All-Australian. Dowler was selected by Hawthorn with the 6th pick in the 2005 AFL Draft, despite being in a car accident in October 2005 in which he suffered a fractured pelvis. The injury restricted his first season but managed to debut for two games late in the 2006 season.

His first game for 2007 came in round 17 against Kangaroos at Launceston's Aurora Stadium. Beau Dowler replaced Mitch Thorp, who had tightness in his calf after Friday's practice match.  He finished with eight disposals, including two goals. Dowler was dropped the following week when Lance Franklin returned from injury.

He managed to string a series of games in 2009 and was listed as one of Hawthorns best in his sixth game. After failing to play a senior game in 2010, Dowler was delisted at the end of the season.

Dowler signed for VFL Club Sandringham on 4-11-2011 and was announced as the club's captain for the 2012 season.

Statistics

|- style=background:#EAEAEA
| 2006 ||  || 34
| 2 || 0 || 1 || 3 || 3 || 6 || 2 || 5 || 0.0 || 0.5 || 1.5 || 1.5 || 3.0 || 1.0 || 2.5 || 0
|-
| 2007 ||  || 16
| 1 || 2 || 1 || 5 || 3 || 8 || 5 || 2 || 2.0 || 1.0 || 5.0 || 3.0 || 8.0 || 5.0 || 2.0 || 0
|- style=background:#EAEAEA
| 2008 ||  || 16
| 0 || — || — || — || — || — || — || — || — || — || — || — || — || — || — || 0
|-
| 2009 ||  || 16
| 13 || 9 || 5 || 107 || 82 || 189 || 65 || 32 || 0.7 || 0.4 || 8.2 || 6.3 || 14.5 || 5.0 || 2.5 || 0
|- style=background:#EAEAEA
| 2010 ||  || 16
| 0 || — || — || — || — || — || — || — || — || — || — || — || — || — || — || 0
|- class="sortbottom"
! colspan=3| Career
! 16 !! 11 !! 7 !! 115 !! 88 !! 203 !! 115 !! 39 !! 0.7 !! 0.4 !! 7.2 !! 5.5 !! 12.7 !! 7.2 !! 2.4 !! 0
|}

References

External links

Hawthorn Football Club players
1987 births
Living people
Australian rules footballers from Victoria (Australia)
Oakleigh Chargers players
Box Hill Football Club players
Sandringham Football Club players